Rustin Spencer "Rust" Cohle is a fictional character portrayed by Matthew McConaughey in the first season of the HBO's anthology television series True Detective. He works as a homicide detective for the Louisiana State Police (LSP) alongside his partner Martin "Marty" Hart, portrayed by Woody Harrelson. The season follows Cohle and Hart's hunt for a serial killer in Louisiana across 17 years.

The character of Rust Cohle and Matthew McConaughey's performance have gained critical acclaim. McConaughey received a Critics' Choice Television Award and nominations for a Golden Globe Award, a Primetime Emmy Award, and a Screen Actors Guild Award for his performance.

Character overview
Cohle is introduced as a gifted, but deeply troubled, detective from Texas who is transferred from working on regional drug task force to LSP near the end of 1994. After three months, in January 1995, he and Hart are tasked with investigating a series of brutal, bizarre murders. A haunted, solitary cynic, Cohle believes that life is meaningless and that human beings are merely "sentient meat". Cohle spends his free time obsessing over every detail of the crime, hoarding evidence and keeping extensive notes in a ledger, which earns him the derisive nickname "The Taxman" among his colleagues.

The series gradually reveals Cohle's backstory. He was born in South Texas but raised in Alaska by his survivalist Vietnam veteran father after his parents divorced. He joined the Houston Police Department as a young man and became a detective in a robbery unit. Years before the main story arc, his two-year-old daughter, Sophia, was killed in a car accident - a tragedy that destroyed his marriage. Devastated by the loss, Cohle grew evermore unstable in his work, eventually killing a crystal meth addict who had injected his own child with the drug. His superiors offered him a chance to avoid prison by working as an undercover narcotics detective in a High Intensity Drug Trafficking Area (HIDTA), which he did for four years; Cohle notes that this was twice as long as most undercover detectives are kept in rotation. During this assignment, Cohle became addicted to drugs, and eventually killed three drug cartel members in a shootout at the Port of Houston, while being shot multiple times himself.

During his recovery, he was committed to a psychiatric hospital in Lubbock. Upon his release, he was offered retirement with full pension, but he declined that offer in favor of transferring to a homicide unit. His superiors then transferred him to Louisiana, where he lives only for his work. Cohle also has synesthesia and suffers from flashbacks from his drug-using years undercover.

The series takes place in two time periods: 1995–2002, in which Cohle and Hart work together to find the killer; and 2012, when Cohle, who has by now quit the police force and become an alcoholic, submits to an interview with LSP detectives Maynard Gilbough (Michael Potts) and Thomas Papania (Tory Kittles) regarding the murders. Cohle sees through the detectives, and realizes that they think he is the killer. He uses the interview to find out what information the detectives have on him and the case.

Character arc
In 1995, Detectives Cohle and Hart are assigned to investigate a murder in which the killer raped and tortured the victim, Dora Lange, and attached a pair of deer antlers to her head after killing her. They find Lange's diary, which contains repeated references to "Carcosa" and a "Yellow King". In the wreckage of a burnt-out church Lange attended, they find a wall painting depicting a human figure wearing antlers.

Cohle and Hart work the case for three months, during which they trace the murder to Reggie Ledoux (Charles Halford), a former Angola prison cellmate of Lange's ex-husband, Charlie Lange (Brad Carter). To find more information and using his past connections from when he was undercover, Cohle infiltrates an outlaw motorcycle club in Galveston called the Iron Crusaders with ties to Ledoux, posing as a drug dealer representing a cartel from Mexico. Known to the biker gang as "Crash", he reluctantly agrees to assist them in a home invasion so he can kidnap the ringleader, Ginger (Joseph Sikora), and force him to lead them to Ledoux, who cooks crystal meth for the biker gang. Accompanied by Cohle, the bikers poorly disguise themselves as police, and attempt to rob a drug house in an African American housing project, which results in a shootout leaving several people dead. Cohle escapes with Ginger, who takes him to meet Ledoux's cousin and "cook partner", Dewall (Ólafur Darri Ólafsson). The meeting does not go well, but Hart follows Dewall to Ledoux's meth lab and calls Cohle to tell him where it is. There, Hart and Cohle discover that Ledoux has kidnapped and tortured two children, and Hart kills Ledoux in a fit of rage. Dewall is killed after he runs off and blows up on one of his own homemade land mines. Cohle stages evidence to support Hart's story that Ledoux opened fire on them, forcing Hart to kill him in self-defense. The two are hailed as heroes, and receive commendations and promotions.

In 2002, Cohle interrogates a suspect who reveals that Ledoux and Dewall did not act alone. He tells Cohle that he will give them information about the "Yellow King" in return for a plea deal. Cohle wants to investigate this lead further, but the suspect suspiciously commits suicide in his cell that night after receiving a phone call. Cohle becomes obsessed with reopening the case, and pursues several leads, including a private Christian school run by Reverend Billy Lee Tuttle (Jay O. Sanders) that had been closed amid rumors of child molestation. Tuttle complains to Cohle's superiors, who suspend Cohle without pay and order him to leave the case closed. That night, Hart's wife Maggie (Michelle Monaghan) shows up at Cohle's apartment and seduces him as revenge for Hart's infidelity. Hart finds out and gets into a fistfight with Cohle in front of the entire department. Cohle quits the force the same day, and becomes a drifter and an alcoholic. He initially returns to Alaska and supports himself as a fisherman. Upon his return to Louisiana, he works as a part-time bartender.

In 2012, murders similar to those from 1995 begin again and Cohle is seen in the vicinity of the body, arousing the suspicion of LSP detectives Gilbough and Papania. They believe that Cohle may have been the killer in 1995, because he led Hart to every break in the case and seemed to know everything about the killer's frame of mind. Gilbough and Papania now believe that Cohle is committing the new murders as well. They interview Cohle and Hart, who both refuse to cooperate once the purpose of the interview becomes clear.

Cohle meets with Hart, who has also quit the police department and runs his own private investigation firm, and tells him that he has found evidence leading to the killer. Hart is skeptical, and still resentful of Cohle for having sex with Maggie, but Cohle convinces him to help with the investigation by showing him a videotape he stole from Tuttle's home. The video is over 20 years old, and shows numerous masked men abusing and killing Marie Fontenot, a missing child whose name had come up in their investigation 17 years earlier. Cohle and Hart track down the original case's chief investigating officer, Sheriff Steve Geraci (Michael Harney), and interrogate him at gunpoint. Geraci tells them that his superior, the late Sheriff Ted Childress, ordered him to halt the investigation; Childress was one of Tuttle's relatives. They soon discover that the Tuttle and Childress families — to whom both Reggie and Dewall Ledoux belong — are related, and have long histories of child abuse and murder. They ultimately discover that the killer is a Childress, and go to the late sheriff's home to investigate.

Cohle and Hart travel to the Childress house, where they find that the sheriff's son, Errol (Glenn Fleshler), is the killer, and discover the remains of his father tied up in a shed. They also encounter Betty Childress (Ann Dowd), his mentally disabled half-sister, with whom he is having an incestuous relationship. Cohle pursues Childress into the catacombs behind the house, which Childress identifies as "Carcosa". Cohle discovers an idol draped in yellow and covered in skulls — the "Yellow King" — and has a hallucination of a spiraling vortex, the same vortex that had been drawn on many of the victims over the past 17 years. Childress stabs Cohle in the abdomen and also attacks Hart, but Cohle saves his partner by shooting Childress in the head, killing him. Gilbough and Papania, whom Hart had called, arrive at the scene. With the evidence Hart and Cohle collected, they connect Childress to dozens of murders, including Dora Lange's.

Cohle falls into a coma, during which he feels the loving presence of his father and daughter. He later wakes up in hospital and leaves with Hart, and looks up at the night sky, telling his partner, "Once there was only dark. If you ask me, the light's winning."

Cohle also makes a brief appearance in season 3. He is indirectly mentioned when a news article from 2012 about him and Hart is seen on a computer screen showcasing their involvement in uncovering the murders committed by Errol Childress.

Awards and nominations
McConaughey received critical acclaim for his portrayal of Cohle, and has won and been nominated for several awards, including:

TCA Award for Individual Achievement in Drama (Won)
Critics' Choice Television Award for Best Actor in a Drama Series (Won)
Golden Globe Award for Best Actor – Miniseries or Television Film (Nominated)
Primetime Emmy Award for Outstanding Lead Actor in a Drama Series (Nominated)
Screen Actors Guild Award for Outstanding Performance by a Male Actor in a Drama Series (Nominated)

See also
"An Inhabitant of Carcosa", an 1886 short story by Ambrose Bierce
Carcosa, a fictional city invented by Ambrose Bierce
The King in Yellow, an 1895 book of short stories by Robert W. Chambers
Yellow Sign, a fictional glyph described in The King in Yellow
The Conspiracy Against the Human Race, an American non-fiction book

References

External links

 
 

Atheism in television
Drama television characters
Fictional alcohol abusers
Fictional characters from Alaska
Fictional characters from Louisiana
Fictional characters from Texas
Television characters introduced in 2014
Fictional bartenders
Fictional drug addicts
Fictional nihilists
Fictional American police detectives
Police misconduct in fiction
Fictional vigilantes
True Detective
American male characters in television
Fictional murderers